Saints named Teresa include:
Saint Teresa of Ávila (1515–1582), or Teresa of Jesus, Spaniard, founder of the Discalced Carmelites, and Doctor of the Church
Saint Thérèse of Lisieux (1873–1897), or Teresa of the Child Jesus, French Discalced Carmelite nun, and Doctor of the Church
Saint Teresa Benedicta of the Cross (1891–1942), Discalced Carmelite Nun, born Edith Stein
Saint Teresa of Los Andes (1900–1920), Discalced Carmelite nun, born Juana Fernández del Solar
Saint Thérèse Couderc (1805–1885), co-founder of the Sisters of the Cenacle
Blessed Teresa of Portugal (1181–1250), Benedictine nun
Mother Teresa, Saint Teresa of Calcutta (1910–1997), founder of the Missionaries of Charity
Teresa Margaret of the Sacred Heart (1747–1770), an Italian Discalced Carmelite nun

See also
Saint Teresa (disambiguation)
Santa Teresa (disambiguation)
Sainte Thérèse (disambiguation)
Teresa, the feminine given name
All pages beginning with Saint Teresa, St Teresa or St. Teresa

Lists of people by name
Teresa